Nathaniel Clements (1705 – May 1777) was an Irish politician and financial figure, important in the political and financial administration of Ireland in the mid-18th century.

Early history
Clements was the fifth son of Robert Clements (1664–1722).  He married Hannah Gore, daughter of William Gore, D.D., Dean of Down, on 31 January 1730.

Career

Clements became Member of Parliament (MP) for Duleek in 1727 under the patronage of Luke Gardiner, a powerful political and business figure in Dublin. He commenced as a junior at the Irish Treasury in 1720 and held extensive offices there. He became the main financial manager of the British and Irish Government in Ireland during the period, and was de facto Minister for Finance from 1740 to 1777. He assumed the offices of Deputy Vice-Treasurer and Deputy Paymaster General on Gardiner's retirement in 1755. In 1761, Clements was returned for Cavan Borough in, holding this seat until 1768. In this year, he was elected for Roscommon Borough as well as Leitrim, and chose to sit for the latter. In 1776, Clements stood for again for Cavan Borough as well as Carrick and represented the latter constituency until his death in 1777.

Property development
Clements was appointed to the office of Chief Ranger of the Phoenix Park and Master of Game and built the Ranger's lodge (subsequently the Viceregal Lodge to his own design in 1751. He had an extensive property portfolio, including Abbotstown, County Dublin, estates in County Leitrim and County Cavan. He was a developer of property in Georgian Dublin, including part of Henrietta Street where he lived at No. 7 from 1734 to 1757. He was one of the richest commoners in Ireland, notwithstanding his involvement in a failed banking venture in 1759.

Charitable activities
Clements was involved in many charitable activities including Dr Steevens' Hospital, the Erasmus Smith Educational Foundation, the Royal Hospital Kilmainham for retired soldiers, and others.

Family
Nathaniel Clements and Hannah Gore had six children:

Robert Clements (1732–1804), created Earl of Leitrim in 1795, elected a representative peer in 1800
Rt. Hon. Henry Theophilus Clements, MP
 Elizabeth, m. 1750, Francis Burton, second Baron Conyngham
Hannah, m. 1752, George Montgomery, Ballyconnell, MP
Catherine, m. Eyre Massey, 1st Baron Clarina
Alice, m. 1773, Gen. Sir Ralph Gore, sixth Baronet, created Earl of Ross.

References
 Review.

See also
Irish House of Commons
Áras an Uachtaráin

1705 births
1777 deaths
Nathaniel
Irish MPs 1727–1760
Irish MPs 1761–1768
Irish MPs 1769–1776
Irish MPs 1776–1783
Members of the Privy Council of Ireland
Members of the Parliament of Ireland (pre-1801) for County Meath constituencies
Members of the Parliament of Ireland (pre-1801) for County Cavan constituencies
Members of the Parliament of Ireland (pre-1801) for County Roscommon constituencies
Members of the Parliament of Ireland (pre-1801) for County Leitrim constituencies